USS Cadmus (AR-14) was a  of the United States Navy during World War II. Cadmus launched on 5 August 1945 by the Tampa Shipbuilding Company in Tampa, Florida, and sponsored by Mrs. B. P. Ward. Cadmus was commissioned 23 April 1946.

Service history
Assigned to the Atlantic Fleet, Cadmus operated from her home port at Norfolk, Virginia, as a repair ship. Calls to east coast ports and cruises in the Caribbean were part of a schedule which called for service to the Fleet during major exercises. On 3 September 1957, the repair ship cleared Norfolk on her first Atlantic crossing. After taking part in NATO Operation Strikeback exercises with Task Force 88 (TF 88) out of Rothesay, Scotland, she visited ports in Scotland, France, and Spain. Through the first half of 1958, she sailed with TF 63 in replenishment missions during fleet exercises in the Mediterranean. From her return to Norfolk on 7 May 1958 through 1960, Cadmus continued her program of east coast and Caribbean operations. Cadmus moved her homeport to Newport, Rhode Island in 1964.

Cadmus was decommissioned on 14 September 1971 and was stricken from the Naval Vessel Register on 15 January 1974. Cadmus was sold under the National Security Assistance Program to the Republic of China on 22 April 1974. She served as ROCS Yu Tai (A-521).

References

 

Amphion-class repair ships
1945 ships
Cold War auxiliary ships of the United States
Ships transferred from the United States Navy to the Republic of China Navy
Auxiliary ships of the Republic of China Navy
Ships built in Tampa, Florida